Helmiä ja sikoja is a 2003 Finnish comedy film directed and written by Perttu Leppä, and starring Mikko Leppilampi and Laura Birn.

Plot
When the Hirvonen brother's (Läde, Timo, Ruho and Poju) bootlegging father ends up in jail, his sons need money to pay his debts to local crooks. The brothers suddenly get a new family member when their stepsister, Saara, moves in with them. Soon they find out Saara has an outstanding singing voice and the boys come up with an idea to send her to a child star contest. To train the girl a former child star, a current pub rose, is employed.

Reviews

Cast
Mikko Leppilampi – Läde
Laura Birn – Laura
Amanda Pilke – Saara
Unto Helo – Timo
Timo Lavikainen – Ruho
Konsta Hiekkanen – Poju
Pekka Valkeejärvi – Ukko
Outi Mäenpää – Saaran mutsi (Saara's mother)
Antti Reini – Lauran miesystävä  (Laura's boyfriend)
Antti Virmavirta – Sika
Tomi Salmela – Limppu
Sakari Kuosmanen – Lehikoinen
Matti Onnismaa – Mutsin miesystävä (Saara's mother's boyfriend)
Risto Salmi – Alkon myyjä (Alko salesman)
Marko Tiusanen – Ulosottomies (bailiff)

External links

2003 films
2003 comedy-drama films
Films directed by Perttu Leppä
2003 comedy films
2003 drama films
Finnish comedy-drama films